Hercules Bellville (June 18, 1939 – February 21, 2009) was an American film producer. Working with Jeremy Thomas at London's Recorded Picture Company for much of his later career, he was an associate producer on The Dreamers and Sexy Beast, and the co-producer of Blood and Wine. Formerly Bellville acted as Roman Polanski's assistant director on many films, working with the director in a creative capacity for over a decade. Bellville was an associate producer on Polanski's The Tenant, and it is his hands that come through the wall to menace Catherine Deneuve in Repulsion.

Filmography
 The Dreamers (2003)
 Sexy Beast (2000)
 All the Little Animals (1998)
 Blood and Wine (1996)
 Strangers Kiss (1983)
 The Tenant (1976)

Gallery

References

Sources

External links

1939 births
2009 deaths
Burials at Highgate Cemetery
Film producers from California
Businesspeople from San Diego
20th-century American businesspeople
21st-century American businesspeople